The Black Curriculum is a British community interest company, founded in 2019, whose mission is "to address the lack of Black British history in the UK curriculum".

History

The organisation was established in 2019 by Lavinya Stennett, who conceived the idea while studying for a degree in African Studies and Development Studies at SOAS University of London and reflecting on her own education in south London, where Black History Month covered slavery, Martin Luther King Jr. and the American civil rights movement but had taught her little about Black British history.

Report
In 2020 the group produced a report, written by Jason Arday, on the lack of black history in the current UK National Curriculum (for England, Northern Ireland, Scotland and Wales). The report "explores how the current History National Curriculum systematically omits the contribution of Black British history in favour of a dominant White, Eurocentric curriculum that fails to reflect our multi-ethnic and broadly diverse society".

Government snub
They hoped to discuss the report with the Secretary of State for Education but their request for a meeting was rejected, the government stating that the existing curriculum was "broad, balanced and flexible, allowing schools to teach Black history".

Black Lives Matter
The Black Curriculum was one of the two causes (the other being Bristol-based Cargo Classroom) chosen by Jen Reid to receive any profits if the statue of her by Marc Quinn, erected in Bristol in July 2020 on the plinth of the toppled statue of Edward Colston in Bristol, was ever sold.

References

Further reading

External links

Educational organisations based in the United Kingdom
Anti-racist organisations in the United Kingdom
2019 establishments in the United Kingdom
Community interest companies